Croxon, Jones & Co (Old Bank) Ltd was a private bank established in Oswestry. It operated between 1792 and 1894.

It was originally known as Gibbons & Coit and, in 1893, was converted into a joint-stock company with limited liability and a paid-in capital of £35,000. Upon conversion the bank was renamed Croxon, Jones & Co (Old Bank) Ltd. 

The bank went through a number of name changes during its 100-year history:

 Gibbons & Coit from 1792
 Croon & Sheppard by 1812
 Croxon & Co by 1814
 Croxon, Longueville, Jones, Croxon & Gibbons by 1829
 Croxon, Longueville & Co by 1834
 Swete, Roberts & Longueville by 1887
 Croxon, Jones & Co in 1893

The bank was also known as Oswestry Old Bank.

In 1894 the bank was acquired by Parr's Banking Co & Alliance Bank Ltd of Warrington and the bank subsequently became a past constituent of NatWest.

The bank's archives are held by RBS and Shropshire Archives.

References

Banks of Wales
Banks of England
Defunct companies of England